KQQB is a broadcast radio station airing Brokered Programming.  The station is licensed to Stockdale, Texas and serves Stockdale and the southeastern portion of the San Antonio metro area in Texas.  KQQB is owned and operated by The Raftt Corporation.

History
KQQB was originally licensed to Hallettsville, Texas at the time of its launch in 1979.  A construction permit has been applied for to expand the station's daytime-only power from 2,500 watts to 20,000 watts.  Thus, this will allow it to be heard across the entire San Antonio Metro area and Victoria, Texas as well.

1520 AM is a United States clear-channel frequency.

References

External links
 

1979 establishments in Texas
Radio stations established in 1979
QQB
QQB